The European route E5 in the United Kingdom is a series of roads, part of the International E-road network, running from western Scotland to southern England. It crosses afterwards the English Channel to France and ends in Spain eventually. The route is not signposted in the United Kingdom.

Route 
The E5 starts in the town of Greenock in western Scotland where it follows the A8 road until Bishopton. There it transforms into the M8 motorway, the busiest motorway in Scotland, and later the M74 motorway, where it passes the largest Scottish city Glasgow. The M74 motorway goes southeast through Scotland and changes into an A-class road at Abington. At the border with England, the M6 motorway starts and continues south passing major cities like Carlisle, Preston, Liverpool, Manchester, Stoke-on-Trent and ends in Birmingham. Around Birmingham, the E5 shortly uses the M42 before connecting on the M40 towards London. After passing Warwick the E5 ends at exit 9 just north of Oxford. Here the E5 leaves the highway and follows the A34 road passing Oxford and Newbury, ending in Winchester. Here it connects on the last part: the M3 motorway, ending in Southampton. Afterwards it uses a non-existing ferry to cross the English Channel to Le Havre, France. The E5 covers a distance of 721 km (448 mi) in the United Kingdom.

Detailed route

References 

European routes in the United Kingdom